Wally Chalmers (27 July 1934 – 18 July 2011) was a South African cricketer. He played in 48 first-class matches from 1951/52 to 1963/64.

References

External links
 

1934 births
2011 deaths
South African cricketers
Border cricketers
Free State cricketers
Western Province cricketers
Cricketers from East London, Eastern Cape